The Ferrari F1-2000 was a Formula One racing car that the Ferrari team competed with for the 2000 Formula One season. The chassis was designed by Rory Byrne, Giorgio Ascanelli, Aldo Costa, Marco Fainello, Nikolas Tombazis and James Allison with Ross Brawn playing a vital role in leading the production of the car as the team's Technical Director and Paolo Martinelli assisted by Giles Simon leading the engine design and operations. The car was a direct development of the F300 and F399 from the previous two seasons, using the same basic gearbox and a new engine with a wider V-angle (90 degrees vs. 75 degrees in the 048 engine); this new wider angle improved and lowered the centre of gravity of the car. It also featured improved aerodynamics over the F399 most noticeably a flatter underside of the nose area, which put it on par with that year's McLaren MP4/15.

Ferrari used 'Marlboro' logos, except at the British, French and United States Grands Prix.

Season performance
The new car had improved cooling over its predecessors and much smaller, more rounded sidepods to improve airflow. Detail changes had been made to the weight distribution to improve handling and make the car as light as possible. Despite the improvements, the F1-2000 used its tyres harder than the McLaren, which was still marginally faster overall but was less reliable than its Italian rival. The car underwent constant development. The angled front wing was replaced with a more conventional flat plane wing at the United States Grand Prix and larger bargeboards were fitted in time for the French Grand Prix. 

Despite a mid season slump which saw three consecutive retirements, Michael Schumacher drove the F1-2000 to his third World Drivers' Title and Ferrari's first after a 21 year title drought. It also defended Ferrari's constructors' crown, and signified the start of the team's dominance throughout the first half of the decade.

In popular culture
The Ferrari F1-2000 was featured in the Codemasters F1 2020 video game as downloadable content for the "Deluxe Schumacher Edition".

Complete Formula One results
(key) (results in bold indicate pole position; results in italics indicate fastest lap)

References

F1-2000
2000 Formula One season cars
Formula One championship-winning cars